Shweta Mohan (born 19 November 1985) is an Indian playback singer. She has received four Filmfare Awards South for Best Female Playback Singer, one Kerala State Film Awards and one Tamil Nadu State Film Awards. She has recorded songs for film music and albums in all the four South Indian languages namely, Malayalam, Tamil, Telugu, Kannada along with the Hindi language and has established herself as a leading playback singer of South Indian cinema. Some of her inspirations are Sujatha Mohan (her mother), Shreya Ghoshal, Alka Yagnik, Sadhana Sargam  and K.S. Chitra.

Kerala State Film Awards 
The Kerala State Film Award are the film awards for a motion picture made in Kerala. The awards have been bestowed by Kerala State Chalachitra Academy since 1998 on behalf of the Department of Cultural Affairs, Government of Kerala, India. Shweta has received one award.

Tamil Nadu State Film Awards 
The Tamil Nadu State Film Awards are the most prestigious film awards given for Tamil films in India. They are given annually to honour the best talents and provide encouragement and incentive to the South Indian film industry by the Government of Tamil Nadu. Shweta has received one awards.

Filmfare Awards South 
The Filmfare Awards South is the South Indian segment of the annual Filmfare Awards, presented by The Times Group to honour both artistic and technical excellence of professionals in the South Indian film industry. Shweta is awarded and also nominated singer by Filmfare South, receiving four awards from eleven nominations.

South Indian International Movie Awards 
The South Indian International Movie Awards, also known as the SIIMA Awards, started in 2012, rewards the artistic and technical achievements of the South Indian film industry. Shweta received one award from Twelve nominations.

Asianet Film Awards 
The Asianet Film Awards is an award ceremony for Malayalam films presented annually by Asianet, a Malayalam-language television network from the south-Indian state of Kerala. Shweta has received three awards.

Vanitha Film Awards 
The Vanitha Film Awards are presented annually by Vanitha, an Indian magazine from the Malayala Manorama group in the south Indian state of Kerala. The awards ceremony has been instituted to honour both artistic and technical excellence in the Malayalam language film industry. Held and broadcast annually since 1998. Shweta Mohan won one awards for two-different song's.

Amritha TV channel Award

V4 Entertainers Award

Jaihind TV Film Awards

Asiavision Movie Awards 
The Asiavision Movie Awards have been held annually since 2006 to honour the artists and technicians of South Indian Cinema. Shweta has received one award.

Mirchi Music Awards South 
The Mirchi Music Awards South is the South Indian segment of the annual Mirchi Music Awards, started in 2010 by Radio Mirchi to honour both artistic and technical excellence of professionals in the South Indian music industry.

Vijay Music Awards

International Tamil Film Awards 
The International Tamil Film Awards, is the Tamil Film segment of the annual International Tamil Film Awards, to honour both artistic and technical excellence of professionals in the Tamil Indian music industry.

South Indian Cinematographers Association Awards

Other major honours and recognitions 

 2007:Doordarshan's Yuva award "Kolakuzhal vili keatto raadhe" Nivedhyam (Malayalam)
 2007:Sunfeast Isai Aruvi Award
 2007. Film Critics Award for Best Female Playback Singer
 2011:Big Tamil Melody Awards for Best Melody Female Playback Singer - "Nee Koorinaal" (180)
 2012:Award for Most Airplays in BIG FM for - "Nee partha vizhigal"(3) (along with Vijay Yesudas)
 2014;Thikkurissy Film Award for Best Female Playback Singer 2014 - ' 'Ottamandaram' ' (shared with Sujatha Mohan)
 2014:SICA Award for Best Female Playback Singer 2014 - "Yarumilla"

References

Lists of awards received by Indian musician